Raden Sugiyono Mangunwiyoto (August 12, 1926–October 1, 1965) was one of 10 revolutionary heroes of Indonesia. He was kidnapped and killed by members of the 30 September Movement.

Family
Mangunwiyoto married Supriyati and had 7 children, 6 sons and 1 daughter.
 R. Erry Guthomo (b. 1954)
 R. Agung Pramuji (b. 1956)
 R. Haryo Guritno (b. 1958)
 R. Danny Nugroho (b. 1960)
 R. Budi Winoto (b. 1962)
 R. Ganis Priyono (b. 1963)
 Rr. Sugiarti Takarina (b. 1965), she was born after the death of her father and her name was given by President Sukarno

Notes

References

1926 births
1965 deaths
Indonesian Christians
National Heroes of Indonesia
Converts to Protestantism from Islam